Roman Czepe (born 15 December 1956 in Ełk) is a Polish politician. He was elected to the Sejm on 25 September 2005, getting 4087 votes in 24 Białystok district as a candidate from the Law and Justice list.

See also
Members of Polish Sejm 2005-2007

External links
Roman Czepe - parliamentary page - includes declarations of interest, voting record, and transcripts of speeches.

1956 births
Living people
People from Ełk
Members of the Polish Sejm 2005–2007
Law and Justice politicians